Chetram Gangwar (died 11 December 2006) was a politician from Uttar Pradesh, India. He was a minister in the Government of Uttar Pradesh and was a member of the Uttar Pradesh Legislative Assembly for over twenty years, as the elected representative for Nawabganj constituency.

References

Year of birth missing
Members of the Uttar Pradesh Legislative Assembly
Politicians from Bareilly
2006 deaths
Indian National Congress politicians
Indian National Congress politicians from Uttar Pradesh